The Best of E-40: Yesterday, Today and Tomorrow is the first greatest hits compilation by American rapper E-40. It was released August 24, 2004 on Jive Records and Sick Wid It Records. The album peaked at number 43 on the Billboard Top R&B/Hip-Hop Albums and at number 133 on the Billboard 200.

A companion DVD was released in 2007, featuring fifteen E-40 music videos.

Album 
Released August 24, 2004 on CD and digital format.

Track listing 
 "Intro" - 0:35
 "Da Bumble" - 4:11 (from the album In a Major Way)
 "Flashin'" - 4:56 (from the album The Element of Surprise)
 "Zoom" - 4:10 (from the album The Element of Surprise)
 "Sideways" (featuring B-Legit & Mac Shawn) - 4:25 (from the album In a Major Way)
 "Carlos Rossi" - 4:45 (from the album Federal)
 "Rapper's Ball" (featuring Too Short & K-Ci) - 5:27 (from the album Tha Hall of Game)
 "Captain Save a Hoe" (featuring The Click) - 4:49 (from the EP The Mail Man)
 "Hope I Don’t Go Back" (featuring Otis & Shug) - 4:39 (from the album The Element of Surprise)
 "Sprinkle Me" (featuring Suga-T) - 4:10 (from the album In a Major Way)
 "Automatic" (featuring Fabolous) - 4:42 (from the album Grit & Grind)
 "Gas, Break, Dip" (featuring The Federation) - 5:05
 "It’s On" (featuring Bone Crusher & Cotton Mouf) - 4:05
 "Thick & Thin" (featuring Lil' Mo) 4:52
 "Bust Yo' Shit" (featuring B-Legit & Rankin Scroo) - 5:02

Music Video DVD 
The Best of E-40: Yesterday, Today and Tomorrow - The Videos is a compilation of music videos,  released July 17, 2007 on DVD.

Track listing 
 "Captain Save a Hoe" (featuring The Click) - (from the EP The Mail Man)
 "Practice Lookin' Hard" - (from the EP The Mail Man)
 "1-Luv" (featuring Levitti) - (from the album In a Major Way)
 "Sprinkle Me" (featuring Suga-T) - (from the album In a Major Way)
 "Dusted 'N' Disgusted" (featuring Spice 1, Mac Mall & Celly Cel) (from the album In a Major Way)
 "Things'll Never Change" (featuring Bo-Roc) - (from the album Tha Hall of Game)
 "Rappers' Ball" (featuring Too Short, K-Ci) - (from the album Tha Hall of Game)
 "Yay Deep" (featuring B-Legit & Richie Rich) - (from the album Southwest Riders)
 "From the Ground Up" (featuring Too Short, K-Ci & JoJo (singer)) - (from the album The Element of Surprise)
 "Big Ballin' with My Homies" - (from the album The Blueprint of a Self-Made Millionaire)
 "Earl That's Yo' Life/L.I.Q." (featuring Too Short, Otis & Shug) - (from the album The Blueprint of a Self-Made Millionaire)
 "Nah, Nah..." (featuring Nate Dogg) - (from the album Loyalty and Betrayal)
 "Automatic" (featuring Fabolous) - (from the album Grit & Grind)
 "One Night Stand" (featuring DJ Kayslay) - (from the album Breakin' News)
 "Quarterbackin'" (featuring Clipse) - (from the album Breakin' News)

Chart history 
Album

References

External links 
 [ The Best of E-40] at Allmusic
 [ The Best of E-40: The Videos] at Allmusic
 The Best of E-40 at MusicBrainz

2004 greatest hits albums
Albums produced by Ant Banks
Albums produced by Rick Rock
Albums produced by Studio Ton
Albums produced by Bosko
2004 video albums
E-40 albums
Jive Records compilation albums
Jive Records video albums
Sick Wid It Records compilation albums
Sick Wid It Records video albums
Gangsta rap compilation albums